Grishneshwar Jyotirlinga Temple, sometimes referred to as the Ghrneshwar  or Ghushmeshwar Temple, is one of the shrines dedicated to Lord Shiva that is referenced in the Shiva Purana. The word Ghrneshwara means "lord of compassion". The temple is an important pilgrimage site in the Shaiva tradition of Hinduism, which considers it as the twelfth Jyotirlinga (linga of light). This pilgrimage site is located in Ellora (also called Verul), less than a kilometer from Ellora Caves – a UNESCO World Heritage Site.

Maharashtra have three Jyotirlingas, Bhimashankar, Trimbakeshwar, and Grishneshwar.

History
The temple structure was destroyed by the Delhi Sultanate in 13th and 14th-century. The temple went through several rounds of rebuilding followed by re-destruction during the Mughal-Maratha conflict. It was rebuilt in the current form in the 18th century under the sponsorship of queen Ahilyabai Holkar of Indore, after the fall of the Mughal Empire. It is presently an important and active pilgrimage site of the Hindus and attracts long lines of devotees daily. Anyone can enter the temple premises and its inner chambers, but to enter the sanctum sanctorum core (garbha-gruha) of the temple, the local Hindu tradition demands that men must go bare-chested.

The Grishneswar temple is an illustration of maratha temple architectural style and structure. The temple, built of red rocks, is composed of a five-tier shikara. The temple was re-constructed by Maloji Bhosale of Verul, (grandfather of Chhatrapati Shivaji Maharaj) in the 16th century and later again by queen Ahilyabai Holkar in the 18th century. She is credited with rebuilding some of major Hindu temples such as the Kashi Vishvanath temple in Varanasi, a Vishnu temple in Gaya, and a much larger Shiva Jyotirlinga temple in Somnath Temple.

This 240 ft x 185 ft temple is the smallest Jyotirlinga temple in India. Halfway up the temple, Dashavataras of Vishnu are carved in red stone. A court hall is built on 24 pillars. On these pillars, there are carvings summarizing various legends and mythologies of Shiva. The Garbhagriha measures 17 ft x 17 ft. The Lingamurty faces eastward. There is a Nandi bull in the court hall. Ghrishneshwar Temple is a revered temple, situated in the state of Maharashtra. The temple houses carvings and sculptures of many Hindu gods and goddesses.

Connectivity
Nearest Airport: Chatrapati Sambhajinagar

Nearest Railway Station: Chatrapati Sambhajinagar

References

Notes

.

External links 
 https://templeknowledge.com/about-grishneshwar-temple/

Hindu temples in Maharashtra
Tourist attractions in Aurangabad district, Maharashtra
Jyotirlingas
Shiva temples in Maharashtra